A Tamagaki is a fence surrounding a Japanese Shinto shrine.

Tamagaki may also refer to:
Tamagaki Station, a railway station in Suzuka, Mie, Japan
Tamagaki Gakunosuke (1784 – 1824), a Japanese sumo wrestler
Tamagaki Oyakata (born 1964), a Japanese sumo wrestler and coach